Phyllanthus rufuschaneyi is a bioaccumulating plant from Sabah, Malaysia. It is grown on the slopes of Mount Kinabalu and then harvested, burned, and the ash can contain up to 25% nickel.

References

rufuschaneyi
Endemic flora of Borneo
Flora of Sabah